Staroselye Airport   is an airport in Yaroslavl Oblast, Russia located 8 km northeast of Rybinsk. It services small transport aircraft and features a small utilitarian layout.

Airlines and destinations
NPO Saturn Airlines (Moscow-Domodedovo, Yaroslavl, St.Petersburg-Pulkovo)

Currently, work is suspended in the airport due to unprofitable operations.

External links
Rybinsk-Staroselye Airport at dir.avia.ru

Airports built in the Soviet Union
Airports in Yaroslavl Oblast
Rybinsk